Thomas Andrew Williams (born 8 July 1980) is a professional footballer who plays for Hashtag United of the  Isthmian League North Division. A defender or midfielder, he made nearly 300 appearances in the Football League playing for numerous clubs.

Born in England, he represented Cyprus at international level.

Career

Club career
Williams was born in Carshalton, London. His professional career began with West Ham United in April 2000 when he joined the club from Walton & Hersham for a fee of £40,000. He went on loan to Peterborough United in March 2001, without having made his senior debut, and the move was made permanent during the summer. He stayed with the Posh for one season, before moving to Birmingham City for a fee of £350,000.

His career stalled at St Andrew's, playing just four games for Birmingham, and, after two loan periods at Queens Park Rangers, during which he scored once, against Huddersfield Town, he rejoined Peterborough United, initially on loan, later joining permanently. In May 2004 Williams went to Barnsley on a free transfer.

He played a full season for the South Yorkshire side, before moving again on a free transfer to Gillingham in July 2005, and then signing for Swansea City in January 2006 after the Gills suffered financial problems. He returned to the side in December 2006 after a hernia operation in November, and was released at the end of the season.

On 27 July 2007, he joined Wycombe Wanderers on a two-year deal.

On 31 December 2007 Williams joined Peterborough United for the third time, initially on an emergency loan to make him available for the match on New Year's Day, for which he was an unused substitute. The loan was converted to a permanent deal two days later.

On 9 November 2009, Williams rejoined Championship side Queens Park Rangers on a short-term loan deal, with a possible view to sign permanently in the January transfer window. This did not happen in the end and he returned to Peterborough during January 2010.

Williams joined former boss Darren Ferguson at Preston North End on loan for the rest of the season. Preston decided not to sign him on a permanent basis, and he returned to Peterborough, where he was released following his contract expiry.

After a pre-season trial, Williams joined Championship club Bristol City on a six-month contract on 5 August 2010.

Williams joined Colchester United on a month's loan on 30 September, later extended for a further two months. He made nine appearances in all competitions and scored once, in a 2–1 win over AFC Bournemouth. Williams' Bristol City contract was terminated on 5 January 2011.

On 14 February, he joined League One club Walsall until the end of the season. He made fourteen league appearances and scored once, in a 1–1 draw with Oldham Athletic. In August 2011, Williams played one match in the Conference for Kettering Town, a 3–0 defeat away at Mansfield Town. He signed for Notts County in August 2012 on a short-term deal, and was released in January 2013 when his contract expired.

Williams played for Southern League Division 1 South and West club Guildford City in early 2014.

In February 2014, Williams was one of a number of foreign signings made by Vanuatu club Amicale to strengthen their team ahead of the 2013–14 OFC Champions League campaign.

He joined Slough Town in March 2016, making five Southern League appearances, before making five appearances for Arizona United in the 2016 USL season. In September 2017 he was playing for Houghton & Wyton in the Cambridgeshire County Football League.

Following a trial in July 2018, Williams joined Hashtag United of the Eastern Counties League Division One South. After his first season ended with promotion as champions, Williams moved into a player/coach role for the 2019–20 season. On 3 September, during an Essex Senior Cup first round win away to Halstead Town, Williams suffered a serious hand injury after smashing a home dressing room window after he had received a red card.

International career
Williams qualifies for Cyprus through his mother, and has one international cap, which came in 2006.

Personal life
Williams is married to former glamour model Nicola McLean.

Honours
Hashtag United
Eastern Counties League Division One South: 2018–19

References

External links

Profile at UpThePosh! The Peterborough United Database

1980 births
Living people
Footballers from Carshalton
Association football midfielders
English footballers
Cypriot footballers
Cyprus international footballers
Cypriot people of English descent
Walton & Hersham F.C. players
West Ham United F.C. players
Peterborough United F.C. players
Birmingham City F.C. players
Queens Park Rangers F.C. players
Barnsley F.C. players
Gillingham F.C. players
Swansea City A.F.C. players
Wycombe Wanderers F.C. players
Preston North End F.C. players
Bristol City F.C. players
Colchester United F.C. players
Walsall F.C. players
Kettering Town F.C. players
Notts County F.C. players
Guildford City F.C. players
Amicale F.C. players
Slough Town F.C. players
Phoenix Rising FC players
English Football League players
National League (English football) players
Southern Football League players
USL Championship players
English people of Greek Cypriot descent
Hashtag United F.C. players
English expatriate sportspeople in the United States
Expatriate soccer players in the United States
English expatriate footballers
Association football coaches